Stonebridge City Farm is an urban farm in St Ann's, Nottingham, England. Created in 1980, it is relatively small in size, being sited in an area of regeneration, on the footprint of a school and grounds that was originally planned to have been built there.

Overview
The farm is a community facility with gardens, wild green space, farm animals, a café, shop, a play area for children, toilets, hand washing facilities and a barn. It is a registered charity, hosts educational visits and work experience, is run entirely on grants and donations, and has staff and volunteers. In January 2020, local Police donated equipment confiscated from drugs crime for use on the Farm, including fertiliser, tools and hardware.

History
The St. Ann's area of Nottingham underwent a great deal of slum clearance starting in the 1960s and 1970s, making way for more-modern council housing. Although much of the area was regenerated, a school that was planned for the site was cancelled and the land became derelict. Urban farms had started to appear in the Netherlands, and in 1977 started to be discussed for this site. By 17 August 1978 a lease was signed, and a barn erected in May 1980.

Gardens
The farm has a number of areas of cultivation, from orchards and greenhouses to more formal gardens and wild spaces. Fruit and vegetables grown there are used in the kitchens of the on-site café, or sold either in the shop or a stall on the nearby Sneinton Market. Bees are also kept, both as pollinators and to harvest their honey.

The gardens have won a number of awards, such as the Civic Trust "Green Flag" award (national standard for parks) and the Royal Horticultural Society/Nottingham in Bloom Gold Medal.

Animals

Livestock
A number of animals of many different sizes are kept. Although these change over time – the farm rescues unwanted animals – rare breed pigs, cows, goats, sheep, Shetland ponies and donkeys are usually to be seen in the paddocks around the farm. A large number of chickens, ducks, turkeys and geese are kept, partly for the eggs they provide. There are also smaller animals such as guinea pigs and rabbits, which may be handled by the public and an aviary of exotic birds (which may not).

Wildlife
The farm is also surrounded by trees and shrubs, which attract wild birds. Events such as the RSPB "Feed the Birds Day" are often staffed by members of the local RSPB group. There are also other wildlife events such as pond dipping held there.

Education and work experience

The farm encourages school visits so that urban children can learn about farm life. It offers courses on beekeeping and gardening, placements for students studying animal-related courses, and supports people with special needs. As well as working outdoors, it has an education building with a purpose-built classroom. The farm hosts a work club for over-18s.

References

External links
Planning application history at Nottingham City Council

City farms in England